George Blaisdell (June 5, 1895 – October 4, 1978) was an American inventor known for creating the Zippo lighter, based on an Austrian lighter in 1933. In the 1940s, George bought buildings that could create a factory that could make the Zippo lighter.

Childhood and Education 
Blaisdell quit school in grade 5, leading his father to send the inventor to a military academy. Blaisdell attended the academy until his sudden dismissal three years later. Thus, Blaisdell only attended school until grade 8. Thereafter, he worked for his family company, the Blaisdell Machinery Company.

Death
George died on October 4, 1978, in Miami Beach, Florida at the age of 83. After his death, his daughters Sarah B. Dorn and Harriet B. Wick took control of the company.

References

Sources 

1895 births
1978 deaths
People from Bradford, Pennsylvania
20th-century American inventors